Amirovo (Ämir) is a rural locality (a village) in Kashkinsky Selsoviet, Askinsky District, Bashkortostan, Russia. The population was 304 as of 2010. There are six streets.

Geography 
Amirovo is located 37 km southeast of Askino (the district's administrative centre) by road. Kashkino is the nearest rural locality.

References 

Rural localities in Askinsky District